Matthew Haines (born 1 December 1989) is an English professional golfer.

Haines turned professional in May 2010 after a successful amateur career, during which he became the youngest ever winner of the Lytham Trophy and represented Great Britain and Ireland in the 2009 Walker Cup as well as England in the European Amateur Team Championship.

Haines began playing on the 2010 Challenge Tour and won the season's final event, the Apulia San Domenico Grand Final. He finished second on the Challenge Tour Rankings to earn his European Tour card for 2011. Haines only made the cut in 8 of his 35 starts and dropped down to the Challenge Tour for 2012. He played on the Challenge Tour from 2012 to 2014.

Haines attended The Howard School in Rainham, Kent

Amateur wins
2007 Peter McEvoy Trophy, Carris Trophy
2008 Lytham Trophy
2009 Berkhamsted Trophy, Duncan Putter, Hampshire Salver
2010 Spanish International Amateur Championship

Professional wins (1)

Challenge Tour wins (1)

Team appearances
Amateur
European Boys' Team Championship (representing England): 2007
European Amateur Team Championship (representing England): 2008, 2009
Walker Cup (representing Great Britain and Ireland): 2009
Bonallack Trophy (representing Europe): 2010 (cancelled)
Jacques Léglise Trophy (representing Great Britain and Ireland): 2007 (winners)
St Andrews Trophy (representing Great Britain and Ireland): 2008 (winners)

See also
2010 Challenge Tour graduates

References

External links

English male golfers
European Tour golfers
Sportspeople from Chatham, Kent
1989 births
Living people